The Governor John L. Pennington House, at 410 E. Third St. in Yankton, South Dakota, was built in 1875.  Also known as South Dakota Magazine Office in 1987, it is a simplified Italianate-style building.  It was registered with the National Register of Historic Places in 1988.

It was home during 1875 to 1891 of Dakota Territory governor John L. Pennington who served as governor for a four-year term from 1874 to 1878.

See also
Governor Leslie Jensen House, Hot Spring, South Dakota, also NRHP-listed
Governor William J. Bulow House, Beresford, South Dakota, also NRHP-listed

References

South Dakota
Buildings and structures in Yankton, South Dakota
Governors' mansions in the United States
Houses in Yankton County, South Dakota
National Register of Historic Places in Yankton County, South Dakota